Tsui Wing (born August 7, 1974) is a Hong Kong actor contracted to TVB.

Tsui is best known for his roles as Kau Chun in the 2007-2008 sitcom Best Selling Secrets and Ma Keung in the 2012-2015 sitcom Come Home Love.

Filmography

Television dramas

References

1974 births
Hong Kong male actors
TVB actors
Living people